The 1946 United States Senate elections were held November 5, 1946, in the middle of Democratic President Harry S. Truman's first term after Roosevelt's passing. The 32 seats of Class 1 were contested in regular elections, and four special elections were held to fill vacancies. The Republicans took control of the Senate by picking up twelve seats, mostly from the Democrats. This was the first time since 1932 that the Republicans had held the Senate, recovering from a low of 16 seats following the 1936 Senate elections.

The vote was largely seen as a referendum on Truman, whose approval rating had sunk to 32% over the president's controversial handling of a wave of post-war labor strikes, such as a nationwide railroad strike in May, at a time when Americans depended on train service for both commuter and long-distance travel. Just as damaging was Truman's back-and-forth over whether to end unpopular wartime price controls to handle shortages, particularly in foodstuffs. For example, price controls on beef had led to a "hamburger famine," but when Truman, in a surprise move, lifted the controls on October 14 — just weeks before the election — meat prices shot up to record levels.

This is only one of two occasions in U.S. history that 10 or more Senate seats changed hands in a midterm election (the other being in 1958), and also one of five occasions where 10 or more Senate seats changed hands in any election, with the other occasions being in 1920, 1932, 1958, and 1980.

The president's lack of popular support is widely seen as the reason for the Democrats' congressional defeat, the largest since they were trounced in the 1928 pro-Republican wave that brought Herbert Hoover to power. And for the first time since before the Great Depression, Republicans were seen as the party which could best handle the American economy.

However, the Republicans also benefited from what today would be called "a good map," meaning that of the one-third of Senate seats up for election, the majority were held by Democrats. Besides the Republicans being able to hold onto all of their seats, this was the party's largest senate gain since 1920.

Results summary 

Colored shading indicates party with largest share of that row.

Source: Clerk of the U.S. House of Representatives

Gains, losses, and holds

Retirements
Three Republicans and five Democrats retired instead of seeking re-election.

Defeats
One Republican, one Progressive, and ten Democrats sought re-election but lost in the primary or general election.

Change in composition

Before the elections

Election results

Race summaries

Special elections during the 79th Congress  
In these special elections, the winner was seated during 1946, ordered by election date, then state.

Races leading to the 80th Congress  
In these general elections, the winners were elected for the term beginning January 3, 1947; ordered by state.

All of the elections involved the Class 1 seats.

Closest races 
Ten races had a margin of victory under 10%:

Alabama (special)

Arizona  

Incumbent Democrat Ernest McFarland ran for re-election to a second term, easily defeating Republican Ward S. Powers in the general election.

California

California (special)

Results

California (regular)

Connecticut  

There were 2 elections for the same seat due to the January 16, 1945, death of Democrat Francis T. Maloney.  Republican Thomas C. Hart was appointed February 15, 1945, to continue the term, pending a special election. Republican Governor of Connecticut Raymond E. Baldwin won both elections, but resigned only three years after the election to become a state judge.

Connecticut (regular)

Connecticut (special)

Delaware

Florida

Idaho (special)

Indiana

Kentucky (special)

Maine

Maryland

Massachusetts  

Republican Henry Cabot Lodge Jr. defeated incumbent David I. Walsh.

Michigan

Minnesota

Mississippi

Missouri

Montana

Nebraska

Nevada

New Jersey

New Mexico

New York  

The New York state election was held on November 5, 1946.

The Socialist Labor state convention met on April 7 and nominated Eric Hass for the U.S.Senate. The party filed a petition to nominate candidates under the name "Industrial Government Party."

The Liberal Party gathered 51,015 signatures and filed a petition to nominate candidates with the Secretary of State on September 2.

The Republican state convention met on September 4 at Saratoga Springs, New York. They nominated Assembly Majority Leader Irving M. Ives.

The Democratic state convention met on September 4 at Albany, New York, and nominated Ex-Governor Herbert H. Lehman (in office 1933-1942) for the U.S. Senate.

The American Labor state convention met on September 3 and endorsed Lehman. Fielding, Chapman and Abt were withdrawn from the ticket on September 5, and Democrats Corning, Young and Epstein substituted on the ticket.

The Socialist Workers Party filed a petition to nominate candidates headed by Farrell Dobbs for Governor.

The Industrial Government, Socialist and Socialist Workers tickets were not allowed on the ballot because of "defective nominating petitions." The Court of Appeals upheld the decisions of the lower courts.

The whole Republican ticket was elected in a landslide.

Obs.:
"Blank, void and scattering" votes: 178,694

North Dakota

North Dakota (special)  

Newly-elected Democrat John Moses had died March 3, 1945, and Republican state senator Milton Young was appointed March 12, 1945, to continue the term, pending a special election.

Young was elected June 25, 1946, to finish the term that would end in 1951.

Young would go on to be elected 5 more times, serving until his 1975 retirement.

North Dakota (regular) 

First-term Republican William Langer was re-elected to a second term.

Langer would be re-elected twice more, serving until his 1959 death.

Ohio  

There were 2 elections to the same seat due to the September 30, 1945, resignation of Republican Harold H. Burton.

Democrat James W. Huffman was appointed to continue the term, pending a special election in which Huffman was not a candidate.  Huffman was, however, nominated to the regular election, which he lost.

Ohio (special)

Ohio (regular)

Pennsylvania 

Incumbent Democrat Joseph F. Guffey lost re-election to Republican Edward Martin.

Rhode Island

Tennessee

Texas

Utah

Vermont  

Incumbent Republican Ralph Flanders successfully ran for re-election to a full term in the United States Senate, defeating Democratic candidate Charles P. McDevitt.

Virginia

Virginia (regular)  

Incumbent Harry F. Byrd Sr. was re-elected to a fourth term after defeating Republican Lester S. Parsons.

Virginia (special) 

Appointed Democrat Thomas G. Burch retired after filling the vacancy caused by the May 28, 1946, death of Democrat Carter Glass.  Democrat Absalom Willis Robertson defeated Republican Robert H. Woods and was elected to finish Glass's term.

Washington

West Virginia

Wisconsin 

Three-term Republican Robert La Follette Jr. lost renomination to Joseph McCarthy, who then won the general election.

}

Wyoming

See also 
 1946 United States elections
 1946 United States gubernatorial elections
1946 United States House of Representatives elections
 79th United States Congress
 80th United States Congress

Notes

References  

 New York: